Tim Clark (born March 4, 1945) is a Canadian multidisciplinary artist.

Life
Timothy D. Clark was born March 4, 1945, in Buckie, Scotland. Clark lives in Montreal where he is a professor of studio art at Concordia University.

Work
Clark is known for his work in photography, performance art and writing.

References

 	

1945 births
Living people
Canadian performance artists
Academic staff of Concordia University
Canadian academics of fine arts